Barbie: Princess Charm School is a 2011 computer-animated fantasy film directed by Zeke Norton and produced by Mattel Entertainment (under the name of Barbie Entertainment) with Rainmaker Entertainment. It was released to DVD on September 13, 2011, and made its television premiere on Nickelodeon on November 13, 2011. The twentieth entry in the Barbie film series, it follows the story of Blair Willows, a poor girl living in the kingdom of Gardania, who wins an annual lottery to attend a prestigious school where girls can train to become princesses or royal ladies. As Blair learns the ways of a proper princess, she discovers the mystery behind the kingdom's missing heiress to the throne.

Official description 
"Barbie stars as Blair Willows, a kind-hearted girl who is chosen to attend Princess Charm School: a magical, modern place that teaches dancing, how to have tea parties, and proper princess manners. Blair loves her classes – as well as the helpful magical sprites and her new friends, Princesses Hadley and Pincess Isla. But when royal teacher Dame Devin discovers that Blair looks a lot like the kingdom's missing princess, she turns Blair's world upside down to stop her from claiming the throne. Now Blair, Hadley and Isla must find an enchanted crown to prove Blair's true identity in this charming and magical princess story!"

Plot
In the kingdom of Gardania, teenage Blair Willows works as a waitress at a small café to support her sickly adoptive mother and younger sister Emily. Returning home, Blair is shocked to find out via a televised broadcast that she has won a lottery for a scholarship to become a Lady Royal—a princess's advisor—at the prestigious Princess Charm School, a magical academy where princesses from different kingdoms are educated. Emily reveals that she signed up Blair for the lottery multiple times to ensure her selection. Despite Blair's reluctance, her mother assures her that attending the school is a good opportunity.

Blair is immediately taken to school via carriage where she is joyfully greeted by a golden retriever named Prince. Blair meets Headmistress Alexandra Privet, who tells her that every student is assigned a fairy to act as their personal assistant. Blair's fairy, Grace, takes her to her dorm where she meets her roommates: Princess Isla, who mixes electronic music, and Princess Hadley, an avid sportswoman. Blair is also introduced to Dame Devin, sister-in-law of the late Queen Isabella, and Devin's daughter, Delancy, who will be crowned princess and ruler of Gardania at the school's graduation ceremony. Blair struggles in her classes due her clumsiness; and is further hampered by Dame Devin and Delancy, who take a strong disliking to Blair and make several attempts to sabotage her. Blair perseveres and improves when she receives special tutoring from Headmistress Privet.

While exploring the palace, Blair and her roommates happen upon a portrait of a young Queen Isabella and note her striking resemblance to Blair. Upon seeing another portrait depicting the late royal family (including Prince as a puppy) and learning that Blair was found by her adoptive mother on the same day the royal family died in a car crash, Isla and Hadley deduce that she is Queen Isabella's long-lost daughter, Princess Sophia, and the true heir to the throne. This discovery is overheard by Delancy. At dinner, Dame Devin announces a plan to demolish the poorer neighborhoods where Blair's family lives and replace them with new parks. She attributes this plan to Delancy, who appears conflicted.

Blair almost decides to return home, but changes her mind and becomes determined to find the legendary crown of Gardania, which is said to glow when worn by the rightful heir. On the night before graduation, Dame Devin plants jewelry in Blair's room and accuses her and her roommates of stealing. The three of them are then ordered to be detained, only to escape with Delancy's help, who believes that Blair really is Princess Sophia. Blair, her roommates, and Grace sneak into the palace vault, but are caught by Dame Devin, who takes the crown and locks the girls inside.

The next morning, Delancy attempts to stall her coronation; giving Isla enough time to deduce the vault code, allowing the girls to escape. Blair arrives at the coronation and makes a claim to the throne. Blair, her friends, and Dame Devin struggle to grab the crown which eventually falls into Delancy's hands. To her mother's dismay, Delancy places the crown on Blair's head. The crown glows and magically dresses Blair in a new gown, confirming her identity as Princess Sophia.

Dame Devin angrily berates her daughter and inadvertently reveals that she orchestrated the deaths of Queen Isabella and her family so Delancy could inherit the throne. Dame Devin is arrested and Sophia/Blair elects Delancy as her Lady Royal. At a celebratory dance party that evening, Sophia/Blair is reunited with her adoptive family.

Cast and characters
 Diana Kaarina as Blair Willows/Princess Sophia, a waitress at "Cafe Gardania" who wins a scholarship to Princess Charm School. She is kind, clever, and diligent, but clumsy. It is later revealed that she is Princess Sophia, the long lost princess of Gardania.
 Morwenna Banks as Alexandra Privet, the headmistress of Princess Charm School.
 Nicole Oliver as Dame Devin, a vindictive school teacher at Princess Charm School, Delancy's mother, and sister-in-law of the late Queen Isabella. She attempts to sabotage Blair at every corner, due to recognizing her as Queen Isabella's lost daughter.
 Brittney Wilson as Delancy Devin, a student at Princess Charm School, Dame Devin's daughter, and the heir presumptive of Gardania. Despite her initially spiteful attitude, she chooses to do the right thing when she learns that Blair is the true heir to the throne. 
 Ali Liebert as Princess Hadley, an athletic student at Princess Charm School and one of Blair's roommates and best friends. Liebert also plays Princess Portia, Delancy's airhead companion.
 Shannon Chan-Kent as Princess Isla, a music-loving Japanese student at Princess Charm School and amateur DJ, and one of Blair's best friends and roommates.
 Vincent Tong as Prince Nicholas, a prince who attends the neighboring Prince Charming Academy and later befriends Blair.
 Madeleine Peters as Emily Willows, Blair's younger sister and Miss Willows' second adopted daughter who signed up Blair for the Princess Charm School lottery multiple times.
 Ellen Kennedy as Miss Willows, Blair and Emily's adoptive mother on whose doorstep Blair was left as a baby after surviving the car crash that killed her birth parents.
 Special guest star: Miranda Ram-Nolte as Princess Miranda

References

External links
 http://www.barbie.com/princess-charm-school/

2011 direct-to-video films
Films set in 2012
Films set in the 2010s
Films set in the 21st century
American direct-to-video films
American animated fantasy films
Princess Charm School
Canadian animated fantasy films
Canadian independent films
2011 computer-animated films
2010s English-language films
Fictional princesses
Films about princesses
Universal Pictures direct-to-video animated films
Universal Pictures direct-to-video films
2010s American animated films
Films set in Europe
2010s children's animated films
2010s children's fantasy films
Canadian direct-to-video films
2011 films
2010s Canadian films